The Concho Valley Council of Governments (CVCOG) is a voluntary association of cities, counties and special districts in West Texas.

Based in San Angelo, the Concho Valley Council of Governments is a member of the Texas Association of Regional Councils.

State Representative Andrew Murr of Junction is the former chairman of the CVCOG executive committee.

Counties served
Coke
Concho
Crockett
Irion
Kimble
Mason
McCulloch
Menard
Reagan
Schleicher
Sterling
Sutton
Tom Green

Largest cities in the region
San Angelo
Brady
Big Lake
Junction
Mason
Sonora

References

External links
Concho Valley Council of Governments - Official site.

Texas Association of Regional Councils